The St Vincent-class battleships were a group of three dreadnought battleships built for the Royal Navy in the first decade of the 20th century. The sister ships spent their entire careers assigned to the Home and Grand Fleets. Aside from participating in the Battle of Jutland in May 1916 and the inconclusive action of 19 August several months later, their service during the First World War generally consisted of routine patrols and training in the North Sea.  was destroyed in 1917 by a magazine explosion with the near total loss of her crew. The remaining pair were obsolete by the end of the war in 1918, and spent their remaining time either in reserve or as training ships before being sold for scrap in the early 1920s.

Vanguards wreck was extensively salvaged before it was declared a war grave. Since 2002, it has been designated as a controlled site under the Protection of Military Remains Act 1986 and diving on the wreck is generally forbidden.

Background and description
The Admiralty's 1905 draft building plan called for four capital ships in the 1907–1908 Naval Programme, but the new Liberal government cut one of these ships in mid-1906 and postponed another to the 1908–1909 Naval Programme, pending the conclusion of the ongoing Hague Peace Convention. The failure of the Germans to agree to any sort of naval arms control caused the government to reinstate the third ship. The Admiralty took until 12 June 1907 to decide not to build one of them as a battlecruiser, in favour of a squadron of four homogeneous battleships.

The design of the St Vincent class was derived from the preceding , with more powerful guns and a slight increase in size and armour.

The St Vincent-class ships were powered by two sets of Parsons direct-drive steam turbines, each of which was housed in a separate engine room. The outer propeller shafts were coupled to the high-pressure turbines and these exhausted into low-pressure turbines which drove the inner shafts. Separate cruising turbines were provided for each shaft. They carried  of coal and an additional  of fuel oil that was sprayed on the coal to increase its burn rate.

Armament

These ships were the first to carry the new 50-calibre breech-loading (BL)  Mark XI gun, which was 5 calibres longer and had a muzzle velocity about  higher than the 45-calibre Mark X gun used in the earlier dreadnoughts. They had a reputation for drooping at the muzzle, which was believed to have an adverse effect at long range, but testing at sea showed the muzzle droop to be within normal tolerances and the accuracy at long range to be satisfactory. The increased muzzle velocity of the Mark XI gun gave it a longer range over the Mark X gun as well as increasing the distance at which it could penetrate 12 inches of armour from  using the same shell. The higher velocity reduced its service life by increasing the wear in the barrel.

The St Vincent class were equipped with ten Mark XI guns in five hydraulically powered twin-gun turrets, three along the centreline and the remaining two as wing turrets. The centreline turrets were named 'A', 'X' and 'Y' from front to rear, and the port and starboard wing turrets were 'P' and 'Q' respectively. The ships carried between 80 and 100 shells per gun.

The secondary armament of the St Vincents consisted of twenty 50-calibre BL four-inch (102 mm) Mark VII guns. Pairs of these guns were installed in unshielded mounts on the roofs of 'A', 'P', 'Q' and 'Y' turrets and the other dozen were positioned in single mounts at forecastle-deck level in the superstructure. They were provided with 150 rounds per gun; the wartime allowance for each gun was 200 rounds. Four 3-pounder  saluting guns were also carried. The ships were equipped with three 18-inch (450 mm) submerged torpedo tubes, one on each broadside and another in the stern, for which nine torpedoes were provided.

Fire control

The control positions for the main armament were located in the spotting tops at the head of the fore and mainmasts. Data from a  Barr and Stroud coincidence rangefinder located at each control position, together with the target's speed and course information, was input into a Dumaresq mechanical computer and electrically transmitted to Vickers range clocks located in the transmitting station located beneath each position on the main deck. Wind speed and direction was called down to the transmitting station by either voicepipe or sound-powered telephone. The range clock integrated all the data and converted it into elevation and deflection data for use by the guns. The target's data was also graphically recorded on a plotting table to assist the gunnery officer in predicting the movement of the target. The turrets, transmitting stations and control positions could be connected in almost any combination. As a backup, two turrets in each ship ('A' and 'Y' in St Vincent) could take over if necessary.

In 1910–1911, the four-inch guns on the roof of the forward turret of Vanguard were replaced by a  rangefinder. This was removed about a year later, roughly at the same time when the rooftop guns were removed from the forward turrets of the other two ships. In late 1914, the remaining rooftop guns were replaced on the three sister ships by 9-foot rangefinders protected by armoured hoods.

Fire-control technology advanced quickly during the years between the St Vincents' commissioning and the start of World War I and the most important development was the director firing system. Mounted high in the ship, a fire-control director electrically provided data to the turrets via a pointer on a dial, which the turret crewmen only had to follow. The director layer fired the guns simultaneously, which aided in spotting the shell splashes and minimised the effects of the roll on the dispersion of the shells. While the exact dates of installation are unknown, St Vincent was equipped with a director by December 1915 and the others by May 1916. The ships were fitted with Mark I Dreyer Fire-control Tables in the transmission stations by early 1916, which combined the functions of the Dumaresq and the range clock.

Armour
Above this was a strake of 8-inch armour. The wing barbettes were similar except that they had 10 inches of armour on their outer faces. The gun turrets had  faces and sides with 3-inch roofs.

The front and sides of the forward conning tower were protected by 11-inch plates, although the rear and roof were 8 inches and 3 inches thick respectively. The aft conning tower had 8-inch sides and a 3-inch roof. In the vicinity of the boiler rooms, the compartments between them were used as coal bunkers.

Modifications

The guns on the forward turret roof were replaced in 1910–1911 by a rangefinder on Vanguard, and on her sisters in 1911–1912. About two years later, gun shields were fitted to most of the guns in the superstructure and the bridge structure was enlarged around the base of the forward tripod mast. During the first year of the war, the base of the forward superstructure was rebuilt to house eight 4-inch guns and the turret-top guns were removed, which reduced their secondary armament to a total of fourteen guns; a pair of 3-inch (76 mm) anti-aircraft (AA) guns were added. Approximately  of additional deck armour were added after the Battle of Jutland in May 1916. By April 1917, the sisters mounted thirteen 4-inch anti-torpedo boat guns as well as single 4-inch and 3-inch AA guns. The stern torpedo tube was removed in 1917–1918 and St Vincent was equipped to operate kite balloons. In 1918, a high-angle rangefinder was fitted on the forward spotting top of the surviving ships and flying-off platforms were installed on the roofs of the fore and aft turrets of Collingwood.

Ships

Careers
Upon commissioning, all three ships were assigned to the 1st Division of the Home Fleet and St Vincent became the flagship of the division's second-in-command. In July, they were present when King George V visited the fleet in Torbay and participated in his Coronation Fleet Review at Spithead on 24 June 1911. Less than a year later, the 1st Division was renamed the 1st Battle Squadron (BS) on 1 May 1912. Collingwood became the squadron flagship on 22 June and reverted to a private ship again two years later. Each of the sisters underwent a lengthy refit before the First World War began in mid-1914.

Between 17 and 20 July 1914, the sisters took part in a test mobilisation and fleet review. Arriving in Portland afterwards, they were ordered to proceed with the rest of the Home Fleet to Scapa Flow two days later to safeguard the fleet from a possible surprise attack by the Imperial German Navy. After the British declaration of war on Germany on 4 August, the Home Fleet was reorganised as the Grand Fleet and placed under the command of Admiral John Jellicoe. According to pre-war doctrine, the role of the Grand Fleet was to fight a decisive battle against the German High Seas Fleet, but German reluctance to commit their battleships against the superior British force led to indecisive operations. The Grand Fleet spent its time training in the North Sea, punctuated by the occasional mission to intercept a German raid or major fleet sortie. In April 1916, Vanguard was transferred to the 4th Battle Squadron while her sisters remained in the 1st Battle Squadron.

Battle of Jutland

In an attempt to lure out and destroy a portion of the Grand Fleet, the German High Seas Fleet departed the Jade Bight early on the morning of 31 May 1916 in support of Rear Admiral Franz von Hipper's battlecruisers, which were to act as bait. The British code breakers of Room 40 at the Admiralty had decoded German radio traffic containing plans of the operation and the Admiralty ordered the Grand Fleet to sortie the night before the Germans, to cut off and destroy the High Seas Fleet.

The Grand Fleet rendezvoused with the 2nd Battle Squadron, coming from Cromarty, Scotland, on the morning of 31 May and Jellicoe organised the main body of the Grand Fleet in parallel columns of four-ship divisions. The two divisions of the 2nd BS were on his left (east), the 4th BS was in the centre and the 1st BS on the right. Vanguard and St Vincent were the rear ships of their divisions while Collingwood was the second ship in its division. When Jellicoe ordered the Grand Fleet to deploy to the left and form line astern in anticipation of encountering the High Seas Fleet, this naturally placed the 4th and 1st Battle Squadrons in the centre and rear of the line of battle, respectively, which meant that the sisters were in the rear of the Grand Fleet once it was deployed. This limited their ability to engage the German ships in the poor visibility. All three ships fired at the crippled light cruiser , possibly scoring some hits, but only St Vincent and Collingwood were able to engage any of the German capital ships. The former hit the battlecruiser  twice, inflicting only minor damage, while Collingwood hit the battlecruiser  once, also with little effect. Vanguard and Collingwood also fired at German destroyers, but failed to achieve any hits. None of the sisters fired more than 98 rounds from their main guns during the battle.

Subsequent activity
After the battle, St Vincent and Collingwood joined Vanguard in the 4th BS. The Grand Fleet sortied on 18 August to ambush the High Seas Fleet while it advanced into the southern North Sea, but a series of communication failures and mistakes prevented Jellicoe from intercepting the German fleet before it returned to port. Two light cruisers were sunk by German U-boats during the operation, prompting Jellicoe to decide not to risk the major units of the fleet to German submarines and mines south of 55° 30' North. The Admiralty concurred and stipulated that the Grand Fleet would not sortie unless the German fleet was attempting an invasion of Britain or there was a strong possibility it could be forced into an engagement under suitable conditions. The Admiralty order meant that the Grand Fleet spent far less time at sea. In late February 1917, the 4th BS conducted tactical exercises for a few days. In January 1918, Collingwood and some of the older dreadnoughts cruised off the coast of Norway for several days, possibly to provide distant cover for a convoy to Norway. Along with the rest of the Grand Fleet, she sortied on the afternoon of 23 April when radio transmissions revealed that the High Seas Fleet was at sea, after a failed attempt to intercept the regular British convoy to Norway. The Germans were too far ahead of the British to be caught and no shots were fired. St Vincent was under repair at Invergordon, Scotland, and could not sortie, but was present at Rosyth when the German fleet surrendered on 21 November; Collingwood was refitting in Invergordon.

Vanguard explosion

In the evening of 9 July 1917, Vanguards magazines exploded and she sank almost instantly, with only three survivors, one of whom died soon afterwards; 842 men aboard were lost. Collingwoods crew recovered the bodies of three men killed in the explosion. The Board of Inquiry concluded that a fire of unknown origin began in a 4-inch magazine and spread to one or both of the nearby 12-inch magazines, which detonated and sank the ship.

Postwar years
In March 1919, St Vincent was reduced to reserve and became a gunnery training ship at Portsmouth. She then became flagship of the Reserve Fleet in June and was relieved as gunnery training ship in December, when she was transferred to Rosyth. There she remained until listed for disposal in March 1921; she was sold for scrap on 1 December 1921 and demolished.

In January 1919, Collingwood was transferred to Devonport and assigned to the Reserve Fleet. Upon the dissolution of the Grand Fleet on 18 March, the Reserve Fleet was renamed the Third Fleet and Collingwood became its flagship. She became a tender to HMS Vivid on 1 October and served as a gunnery and wireless telegraphy training ship until early August 1920, when the ship returned to the reserve. Collingwood served as a boys' training ship on 22 September 1921 until she was paid off on 31 March 1922. Collingwood was sold for scrap on 12 December and was broken up.

Much of Vanguards wreck was salvaged before it was declared a war grave in 1984. The bow and stern areas are almost intact as has been revealed by a survey authorised by the Ministry of Defence in 2016 in preparation for the centenary commemoration planned for 2017. The wreck was named a controlled site in 2002 and cannot be dived upon, except with permission from the Ministry.

Notes

Citations

Bibliography

External links

 Dreadnought Project – Technical material on the weaponry and fire control for the ships
 World War 1 Naval Combat

Battleship classes
Ship classes of the Royal Navy